Soddy-Daisy is a city in Hamilton County, Tennessee, United States. The population was 13,070 at the 2020 census and estimated to be 13,619 in 2022. The city was formed in 1969 when the communities of Soddy (to the north) and Daisy (to the south), along with nearby developed areas along U.S. Highway 27, merged to form Soddy-Daisy. It is becoming a bedroom community of nearby Chattanooga and is part of the Chattanooga Metropolitan Statistical Area. Sequoyah Nuclear Generating Station is located in Soddy-Daisy.

History
Soddy-Daisy is an incorporated city, comprising the former Tennessee cities of Soddy and Daisy. It has frequently been noted on lists of unusual place names.

Soddy-Daisy was home to Hamilton County's first courthouse and government seat, Poe's Tavern. The tavern, built in 1819, was the home of Soddy-Daisy resident Hasten Poe. In 1838, the tavern served as a way station for 1,900 Cherokees who were on the Trail of Tears. During the Civil War, Poe's Tavern served as a hospital for both Union and Confederate troops. Though the original Poe's Tavern was torn down in 1911, the city of Soddy Daisy has reconstructed a replica of the building a block away from the original site.

There are two popular stories about how the city of Soddy got its name. The first is that the word "Soddy" is an anglicization of Tsati, a shorter form of the Cherokee word ᎠᏂ ᎫᏌᏘ Ᏹ (Ani-Kusati-yi), referring to the Muskogean Koasati people who lived there in the 18th century prior to Cherokee migration to the area after 1776. The second theory is that Soddy was named for William Sodder, who ran a trading post in the city. Others claim that Soddy's name is a reference to Soddy Creek, which is believed to have originated from the Cherokee word Sauta, which is derived from Echota. Soddy was a very small town until the Soddy Coal Company began mining in 1867.

Daisy is rumored to have taken its name from Daisy Parks, the daughter of Thomas Parks. Thomas Parks was Vice-President of the Tabler-Cleudup Coal & Coke Company, and founded the Daisy Coal Company in April 1881.

The two cities incorporated in April 1969 along a  stretch of U.S. 27.

Geography
Soddy-Daisy is located in north-central Hamilton County at  (35.258538, -85.176996). Its southwestern end is bordered by the city of Chattanooga. Unincorporated communities that border Soddy-Daisy are Middle Valley to the south, Falling Water to the southwest, Mowbray Mountain to the west and Flat Top Mountain to the northwest.

The city is situated at the base of the Cumberland Escarpment, the east face of Walden Ridge, which is part of the Cumberland Plateau. An inlet of Chickamauga Lake (consisting of the lower part of Soddy Creek) lies to the east. U.S. Route 27 is the city's main highway, connecting it with Chattanooga  to the south and Dayton  to the northeast.

Demographics

2020 census

As of the 2020 United States census, there were 13,070 people, 5,628 households, and 3,378 families residing in the city.

2000 census
As of the census of 2000, there were 11,530 people, 4,511 households, and 3,392 families residing in the city. The population density was 500.6 people per square mile (193.3/km2). There were 4,809 housing units at an average density of 208.8 per square mile (80.6/km2). The racial makeup of the city was 98.15% White, 0.60% African American, 0.24% American Indian, 0.19% Asian, 0.01% Pacific Islander, 0.17% from other races, and 0.63% from two or more races. Hispanic or Latino of any race were 0.80% of the population.

There were 4,511 households, out of which 31.6% had children under the age of 18 living with them, 59.9% were married couples living together, 11.4% had a female householder with no husband present, and 24.8% were non-families. 21.8% of all households were made up of individuals, and 8.8% had someone living alone who was 65 years of age or older. The average household size was 2.53 and the average family size was 2.93.

In the city, the population was spread out, with 23.0% under the age of 18, 8.7% from 18 to 24, 29.3% from 25 to 44, 25.5% from 45 to 64, and 13.5% who were 65 years of age or older. The median age was 38 years. For every 100 females, there were 93.3 males. For every 100 females age 18 and over, there were 90.3 males.

The median income for a household in the city was $37,163, and the median income for a family was $41,394. Males had a median income of $32,073 versus $23,147 for females. The per capita income for the city was $16,889. About 6.5% of families and 8.8% of the population were below the poverty line, including 10.6% of those under age 18 and 13.4% of those age 65 or over.

Government
Soddy-Daisy's City Commission currently consists of Rick Nunley, City Mayor; Robert Cothran, Vice Mayor; other city commissioners are Gene Shipley, Jim Coleman, and Steve Everett.

The City Manager is currently Burt Johnson, who is also the Finance Director and Recorder. The Public Works Director is currently Steve Grant.

The Fire Chief is currently Dusty Morgan and the Police Chief is Mike Sneed.

The City Judge is currently Marty Lasley, the City Attorney is currently Sam Elliot, and the City Court Clerk is currently Lena Curtis.

Education

Schools 
Soddy-Daisy has six schools: 
Allen Elementary
Daisy Elementary
Soddy Elementary
Ivy Academy
Soddy-Daisy Middle
Soddy-Daisy High School

Library 
Soddy-Daisy has a privately-operated community library, which opened in 2018 with the support from local residents, businesses and organizations following years without a public library within the Soddy-Daisy city limits or in the Sale Creek area.

Museum 
Soddy-Daisy has one museum, which was opened in 2017 and remains operated by the city's historical association. The museum, currently housed in the 100 year old former bank building in Soddy has exhibits that showcase and teach the history of Soddy-Daisy area. The historical association also hosts an annual history fair at Soddy-Daisy High School every January.

Media
 Soddy-Daisy has one local radio station licensed to its community, WGOW-FM.

Notable people
 Joe Chaney, darts player
 Terry Gordy, professional wrestler
 Bryan Harvey, former Major League Baseball relief pitcher
 Ralph McGill, journalist
 Stefanie Wittler, Miss Tennessee 2009

References

External links
City of Soddy-Daisy official website

Cities in Tennessee
Cities in Hamilton County, Tennessee
Cities in the Chattanooga metropolitan area
Populated places established in 1969
1969 establishments in Tennessee
Coal towns in Tennessee
Tennessee populated places on the Tennessee River